Hans Edvard Nørregård-Nielsen (born 2 January 1945) is a Danish art historian.

He is an alumnus of Ribe Katedralskole and has written several memoirs. In 2001, he was awarded the De Gyldne Laurbær prize for Riber Ret. His 1995 book, Golden Age of Danish Art reviews early nineteenth-century art. He was Chairman of the New Carlsberg Foundation Board until the end of 2013. He is also an adjunct professor of art history at the Aarhus University. He was awarded the Ingenio et Arti gold medal in 2013.

Awards
Nørgaard-Nielsen received the N. L. Høyen Medal in 2003.

See also
 Danish Culture Canon

References

1945 births
Danish art historians
Academic staff of Aarhus University
Living people